Ocotea usambarensis is a species of Ocotea (family Lauraceae), native to eastern Africa in Kenya, Tanga Region of  Tanzania, and locally in Uganda, where it occurs at 1600–2600 m altitude in high rainfall montane cloud forest. Common names include East African camphorwood, mkulo (Tanzania), mwiha (Uganda), muwong, muzaiti, and maasi.

It is a large evergreen tree growing to 35 m (exceptionally 45 m) tall, with fast growth (up to 2 m per year) when young. The leaves are opposite (sometimes alternate on fast-growing stems), elliptic to oval, 4–16 cm long and 2.5–9 cm wide, dark green above, pale below, with an entire margin and an acuminate apex. The foliage has a distinct scent of camphor. The flowers are inconspicuous, greenish-yellow; the fruit is a small drupe 1 cm long.

Uses
It is an important timber tree, valued for the resistance of its wood to fungal decay.

References

AgroForestry Tree Database: Ocotea usambarensis
FAO Indigenous multipurpose trees of Tanzania: Ocotea usambarensis

usambarensis
Flora of Kenya
Flora of Tanzania
Flora of Uganda
Trees of Africa
Afromontane flora